The Valea Baciului is a right tributary of the river Urluia in Romania. It passes through Lake Baciului and flows into the Urluia near Rasova.

References

Rivers of Romania
Rivers of Constanța County